Reiko Hiura (born 27 March 1984) is a Japanese table tennis player. Her highest career ITTF ranking was 36.

References

1984 births
Living people
Japanese female table tennis players